Crambus nolckeniellus is a moth in the family Crambidae. It was described by Zeller in 1872. It is found in Colombia.

References

Crambini
Moths described in 1872
Moths of South America